Roebourne Regional Prison is an Australian prison  near Roebourne in the City of Karratha in the Pilbara region of Western Australia. It was established in March 1984 following the closure of the colonial-era Roebourne Gaol.

 the new facility is controversial because of potential for deaths in custody of its predominantly Indigenous inmates—cells can swelter in 50-degree-Celsius temperatures with no air-conditioning.

References

External links
 Corrective Services - Roebourne Regional Prison

Prisons in Western Australia
Pilbara
1984 establishments in Australia